Jammz is a grime MC and record producer from Hackney, East London and the founder of the record label I Am Grime.

Career
Although he had already released an early mixtape, Jammz started to make a proper name for himself in 2014, and was frequently cited as part of grime's "radio renaissance" of those years due to his appearances on radio stations such as Rinse FM, BBC Radio 1xtra, NTS and Radar Radio.

His single 'Hit Then Run', released in 2015, was voted as Noisey's Third Best Grime Track of that year and was playlisted on BBC Radio 1xtra. He also collaborated with Plastician on the single 'London Living', and Finn & Fallow on the single 'Final Warning'.

In March 2016, Jammz supported Kano on the UK leg of his Made In The Manor tour and featured on the front cover of the Observer Music Magazine, alongside Krept & Konan, Stormzy, Novelist and Little Sims as part of an article titled 'How British MCs Found a Voice of Their Own'. In July 2016, he featured in GQ's documentary The Business of Grime.

In November 2016 Jammz released his Warrior EP to acclaim from Fader, Complex, FACT Mag, Noisey and more, and he performed at his first London headline show in December of that year.

In 2017 he collaborated with DJ Q on the single 'Who's That Girl', an answer song to Dizzee Rascal's "I Luv U", and released the singles 'Oh Please' and 'Know Yourself' (with Westy).

Personal life
Jammz is of Jamaican and Vincentian descent.

References

External links
 

1991 births
People from the London Borough of Hackney
Grime music artists
Living people
English people of Jamaican descent
English people of Saint Vincent and the Grenadines descent